Mandu-guk (饅頭-) or dumpling soup is a variety of Korean soup (guk) made by boiling mandu (dumplings) in a beef broth or anchovy broth mixed with beaten egg.

History 
According to the 14th century records of Goryeosa (고려사), mandu had already been introduced via Central Asia during the Goryeo era. Mandu was called sanghwa (쌍화) or gyoja (교자) until the mid-Joseon Dynasty and became a local specialty of the Pyongan and Hamgyong regions, as both wheat and buckwheat — the main ingredients for flour — were mainly cultivated in the north.

Mandu was made and cooked in various ways, including manduguk. In the Korean royal court, the dish was called byeongsi (병시) while in Eumsik dimibang, a Joseon Dynasty cookbook, it was called "seokryutang" (석류탕). The exact era when manduguk got its modern name is unknown.

Preparation and serving 

Dumplings are made by rolling out thin circles of dough, creating a half-moon shape and filling them with a mixture of minced meat, vegetables, tofu and sometimes kimchi. The dumplings are then boiled in a broth traditionally made by boiling anchovies, shiitake mushroom stems and onions.  

Some variations make the broth from beef stock. The addition of tteok, a cylindrical rice cake, is common as well, changing the dish's name into tteok-mandu-guk.

See also 
 Mandu, dumpling
 Tteokguk, rice cake soup
 Kalguksu, knife-cut noodle soup
 Kreplach, dumpling soup

References

External links 
 Winter foods at Korea Tourism Organization official site
 Korean soups, Life in Korea
 Recipe for manduguk

Dumplings
Korean soups and stews
Anchovy dishes
Korean New Year foods